Herbert Mornington Cannon (1873–1962), commonly referred to as Morny Cannon, was a six-time Champion jockey in the United Kingdom in the 1890s. He holds the records for the most wins by a jockey in the Craven Stakes, Coronation Stakes and Prince of Wales's Stakes. His most famous mount was Flying Fox who won the British Triple Crown in 1899. He was the son of English jockey and trainer Tom Cannon (1846–1917).  In his day he was considered the most perfect master of style and he epitomised "the art of jockeyship".

Early life
Herbert Mornington Cannon was born on 21 May in Houghton, Hampshire, the same day that his father Tom Cannon won the Somersetshire Stakes, at Bath, on a colt named Mornington (who also won the 1873 City and Suburban Handicap). Cannon derived his middle name from his father's mount and went by the nickname "Morny" for much of his racing career.

His mother was Catherine Day, a grand daughter of English horse trainer John Barham Day. Cannon had three brothers who were also jockeys: Walter Kempton (1879–1951), Tom Cannon, Jr. (1872–1945) and Charles. His sister Margaret married Ernest Piggott, who was the grandfather of champion jockey Lester Piggott.

He was educated at Banister's Court, Southampton, and afterwards at Queenswood College by a private tutor.

He married Miss E (Nelly) Dennett, of The Park, Nottingham, on 11 January 1894, at the old parish church, St Mary Abbots, Kensington. The wedding was a quiet one owing to the recent death of the bride's father. They honeymooned in Brighton with a view to setting up home near Danebury.

Racing career
He had his first mount in public on 11 October 1886, on his father's mare Coraline at Kempton in the Middlesex All-aged Selling Plate. He finished well behind. His first mount in 1887 was at the Epsom Spring Meeting. Claiming the 5 pound apprentice allowance, he rode Koster at 6 stone 3 pounds in the Metropolitan Stakes. Cannon's first race win occurred shortly before his fourteenth birthday, on 20 May 1887, in the City Bowl Salisbury. on Mr H E Tidy's Flint. By 1900 Cannon had won 1,542 races. His most famous mount was Flying Fox with which he captured the 1899 St. Leger Stakes, 2,000 Guineas and Epsom Derby, securing the Triple Crown. During his career, he was noted as having good hands for piloting 2-year-old horses.

Morny Cannon’s Doncaster

Cannon monopolised the 1894 Doncaster St Leger meeting. His wins were as follows:
First Day: -Stand Plate (9 runners), Rowallan, 100/8; Champagne Stakes (5), Solero, 10/1; Great Yorkshire Handicap (16), Bushey Park, 100/12; Doncaster Welter (13), Lumberer, 100/8.
Second Day: – Milton Stakes (7), Newmarket 4/5; St Leger (8), Throstle, 50/1.
Third Day: – Juvenile Selling (10), Queen Saraband, 9/4; Rous Plate (6), Matabele, 100/30; Portland Plate (15), Grey Leg, 8/1; Corporation Selling (10), St Ignatius, 11/8.
He drew a blank on the fourth day but was second in the Doncaster Cup on the 100/6 shot Portland.  There were 26 races over the four days and Cannon rode in all but five of them yielding ten wins, four seconds, two thirds. There was almost one more because after dead-heating in the Tattersalls Stakes on The Brook he was beaten in the run-off.
As well as winning most of the principle races the majority of his winners were outsiders and Throstle's 50/1 victory in the St Leger was sensational.  He was originally entered as a pacemaker for his more fancied stable mate, Matchbox, but it was Morny's idea to change tactics and so bring off a memorable success.  As John Porter, Throstle's trainer understated, Morny "was in irresistible form."

Diamond Jubilee
Cannon would have ridden another Triple Crown winner in 1900, but Diamond Jubilee had an intense dislike of the jockey. Jack Watts, Prince of Wales's jockey, had already refused to take the ride on the notoriously unruly Diamond Jubilee, before connections turned to Cannon. Cannon had ridden the horse in the Boscawen Stakes in 1900, achieving a narrow win over Paigle in a finish that required a generous application of whip on Diamond Jubilee. The horse never again allowed Cannon to ride him, rolling on top of the jockey on one occasion. Cannon's advice to the Prince was that "a brute like that ought to be shot," whilst claiming that he would not ride the horse for a pension. Diamond Jubilee was instead ridden by newcomer Herbert Jones during his Triple Crown campaign.

Career statistics

Cannon won six Jockeys' Championship and retired from racing in 1909.

Riding style

Morny's spell at the top was curtailed by rising weight and the 'American Invasion' of jockeys, which led to faster run races and riding in a crouching style with a shorter length of stirrup.At the time, despite the success of the American style of riding, many were convinced it was not the proper way to sit a horse. They felt sure in the long run the traditional English style of riding would prove the more successful, as it was certainly the more elegant and artistic. However, in their prime, there was not much to choose between "Tod" Sloan and Cannon as horseman, but Morny was well clear when it came to honesty and integrity.

Despite his success in the saddle, trainer Mat Dawson, Fred Archer's mentor, dismissed him as a 'dilettante jockey'. Most turfites, however, concurred with Rapier's opinion that Morny was always a "the most conscientious of professional horseman." Cannon was one of the old school of jockeys like Fordham and Archer, but towards the end of his career altered his riding methods, having his saddle further forward and shortening his stirrup leathers. He was also known for leaving his challenge very late in races, a trait he had learnt from his father, and considered the "English style", to win by the narrowest margin. Fellow jockey and later trainer, George Lambton commented, "It really was extraordinary, after apparently being out of a race, how he would sweep down on three or four struggling horses and beat them",
also adding, "there is no doubt that most of the jockeys were frightened to death of Morny with his tremendous rush at the finish."  Such tactics were not always popular.  Another trainer, John Porter believed it cost him the 1901 Derby on William The Third.  However, weighing room colleague, Danny Maher, considered Morny as, "one of the finest horsemen that he had ever fought out a finish."

Retirement
Increasingly suffering from rheumatism Cannon announced his retirement from racing in April 1909 and lived in Brighton and Hove for many years until his death in 1962 at the age of 89.

Maybe of Interest
The nine times Champion Jockey in Ireland, Morny Wing was named after Morny Cannon, whom his father idolised.

He is mentioned in James Joyce's "Ulysses", "Morny Cannon is riding him."

See also
List of significant families in British horse racing

References

Bibliography

External links

1873 births
1962 deaths
People from Test Valley
British Champion flat jockeys
English jockeys